Muazu Ahmad Magaji (popularly known as Dansarauniya) is an oil and gas engineer, activist, and a Nigerian politician from Kano state.

Early life and education 
Muazu was born in Sarauniya village of Dawakin Tofa local government area of Kano State, Muazu obtained his first School Certificate in 1980; he attended Dawaking Tofa Secondary school between 1980 and 1983, and obtained his National Diploma in Mechanical engineering from Kano State Polytechnic in 1989. He graduated with his Bachelor of Engineering in Mechanical Engineering from Bayero University Kano, and obtained his Masters in Oil & Gas Engineering from Robert Gordon University in 2000; he obtained qualifications in project management, oil & gas well engineering, geosciences and Information Technology in 2006.

Career
Muazu started his career in the Kano State Civil Service Commission in 1989 and retired in 2009, when he joined Shell Oil Company for ten years.

Politics
in 2010 President Goodluck Jonathan appointed him as the SURE-P Project Coordinator where he served between 2010 and 2013. Governor Rabiu Kwankwaso appointed him as Senior Special Assistant on Project planning and monitoring between 2013 and 2015. Muazu contested the governorship in 2014 and stepped down before the primary election.

Muazu was also appointed Commissioner of Works by Governor Abdullahi Umar Ganduje in 2019. On 17 April 2020 Abba Kyari, chief of Staff to President Muhammad Buhari, died of the COVID-19 infection. On his Facebook page Muazu made several comments on the death of Mr Kyari: "Win win … Nigeria is free and Abba Kyari dies in epidemic … The martyrdom of man is perfect!” Commissioner of Information Comrade Muhammad Garba announced that Muazu lost his position of Commissioner immediately, because people were saying he was celebrating the death of Mr Kyari, although Muazu denied it.

Governor Abdullahi Umar Ganduje re-appointed him as a Chairman of NNPC-AKK Pipeline Project Delivery and the Kano State Industrialization Committee

Muazu also tested Positive to COVID-19 and was isolated for about 3 to 4 weeks at one of the 3 Isolation centres in Kano. He was eventually discharged after testing negative.

References 

1969 births
21st-century journalists
Living people
Bayero University Kano alumni
People from Kano State
20th-century Nigerian politicians
21st-century Nigerian politicians
Politicians from Kano
Politicians from Kano State